Oulaxiuma Township (Mandarin: 欧拉秀玛乡) is a township in Maqu County, Gannan Tibetan Autonomous Prefecture, Gansu, China. In 2010, Oulaxiuma Township had a total population of 3,183: 1,642 males and 1,541 females: 1,025 aged under 14, 2,009 aged between 15 and 65 and 149 aged over 65.

References 

Township-level divisions of Gansu
Gannan Tibetan Autonomous Prefecture